The Minister for Gender Equality (Swedish: Jämställdhetsministern) is a cabinet minister within the Swedish Government and appointed by the Prime Minister of Sweden.

The minister is responsible for issues regarding gender equality, popular education and policies for the civil society. The current Minister for Gender Equality is Paulina Brandberg, appointed on 18 October 2022.

List of Ministers for Gender Equality

Ministry history 
The office of Minister for Gender Equality have been under several different ministries since its founding in 1954.

See also
Minister for Women and Equalities

Government ministers of Sweden